Białynia is a Polish coat of arms. It was used by several szlachta families in the times of the Kingdom of Poland and the Polish–Lithuanian Commonwealth.

History
This coat of arms was acquired in Poland in 1332 during the last year of the reign of Władyslaw Łokietek (Władysław I the Elbow-high). The king led an expedition against the Knights of the Teutonic Order (Teutonic Knights). When the army reached the enemy's camp, a knight of the house Jastrzębiec concealed flaming arrows from the night watch and torched the enemy's tents. The fire enabled the king's army to rout and kill the enemy with dispatch. The knight's ingenuity was rewarded with the addition of an arrow to the family's coat of arms which was then named for the village, Białynia, near which the action took place.  The talked of expedition likely took place during the famous Battle of Płowce which occurred on 27 September 1331.

Blazon
A white horseshoe with its ends pointing upwards with a cross in the middle on a shield, above the cross an arrow flying upwards upon a blue background.  Five ostrich feathers on the knight's helmet.

Variations

A number of variations of the Bialynia coat of arms appeared for different families.

Notable bearers
Notable bearers of this coat of arms include:

Józef Białynia Chołodecki
Mikołaj Światopełk-Mirski

See also
 Polish heraldry
 Heraldic family
 List of Polish nobility coats of arms

References
 Gajl Tadeusz "Herbarz polski od średniowiecza do XX wieku", 2007 

Polish coats of arms